The Military ranks of the United Arab Emirates are the military insignia used by the United Arab Emirates Armed Forces. Being a former British protectorate, United Arab Emirates shares a rank structure similar to that of United Kingdom.

Commissioned officer ranks
The rank insignia of commissioned officers.

Other ranks
The rank insignia of non-commissioned officers and enlisted personnel.

References

External links
 

United Arab Emirates
Military of the United Arab Emirates
United Arab Emirates